Lunas is the name of several places:

 Lunas, Dordogne, France
 Lunas, Hérault, France
 Lunas, Kedah, Malaysia
 Lunas (state constituency)